Viva! Love (lit. "Celebrate! Our Love") is a 2008 South Korean romance film directed by Oh Joum-kyun. It won Best Film at the 45th Baeksang Arts Awards, as well as several Best New Director prizes for Oh.

Plot
Bong-soon is a middle-aged housewife who runs a lodging house. She lives with her good-for-nothing husband who's quietly having an affair, and her selfish, unemployed daughter Jeong-yoon whose boyfriend Gu-sang is a tenant who owns the neighborhood laundromat. When Jeong-yoon finally lands a job, she moves out and abruptly breaks up with Gu-sang. Bong-soon sees the heartbroken Gu-sang drinking away his sorrows, and taking pity on him, she takes him home and attempts to comfort him. One thing leads to another, and the two sleep together. To her great surprise, Bong-soon ends up pregnant with Gu-sang's baby. Despite the age gap and the neighbors' disapproval, the two fall in love and Gu-sang makes Bong-soon feel like a giddy teenage girl again.

Cast
Kim Hae-sook as Bong-soon
Gi Ju-bong as Mr. Ha, Bong-soon's husband 
Kim Young-min as Gu-sang
Kim Hye-na as Jeong-yoon
Bang Eun-hee as Hairdresser
Min Kyeong-jin as Mr. Choi 
Jeong Jae-jin as Mr. Lee 
Shin Cheol-jin as Mr. Yoon 
Hong Seok-yeon as Mr. Kim 
Jo Han-hee as Mr. Choi's wife 
Oh Joo-hee as Mr. Lee's wife 
Kim Yong-seon as Mr. Yoon's wife 
Lee Yong-nyeo as Mr. Kim's wife 
Yang Ik-june as Student boarder 1 
Im Yong-jae as Student Boarder 2
Lee Jun-sik as Redevelopment site employee
Han Gyu-nam as Young man
Shim Hye-gyu as Single bodhisattva
Geum Dong-hyeon as Pharmacist 
Lee Eung-jae as Male customer at noraebang
Jang Gyeong-jin as Female customer at noraebang

Awards and nominations

References

External links

2008 films
South Korean romantic comedy films
2008 romantic comedy films
2000s South Korean films